Simone Aresti (born 15 March 1986) is an Italian professional footballer who plays as a goalkeeper for  club Cagliari.

Club career 

During the 2011–12 Lega Pro Seconda Divisione season, the goalkeeper Aresti, while wearing the shirt of Italian club Savona, scored 2 goals.

On 10 July 2018, Aresti returned at Serie A side Cagliari.

On 4 January 2020, he returned to Olbia, signing a contract until the end of the 2019–20 season.

Personal life
On 19 December 2020 he tested positive for COVID-19.

References

External links
 Skysports profile
 
 

1986 births
Living people
Italian footballers
Cagliari Calcio players
U.S. Pistoiese 1921 players
Savona F.B.C. players
Delfino Pescara 1936 players
Olbia Calcio 1905 players
Serie A players
Serie B players
Serie C players
People from the Province of South Sardinia
Footballers from Sardinia
Association football goalkeepers
Pol. Alghero players